Schumacher Kuwali (born 27 June 1996) is a Malawian football midfielder who currently plays for UD Songo.

References

1996 births
Living people
Malawian footballers
Malawi international footballers
Blue Eagles FC players
Clube Ferroviário de Nampula players
UD Songo players
Association football midfielders
Malawian expatriate footballers
Expatriate footballers in Mozambique
Malawian expatriate sportspeople in Mozambique